Oh Jeong-suk (오정숙, hanja: 吳貞淑; 21 June 1935 – 7 July 2008) was an ingan-munhwage for pansori. She was designated as an ingan-munhwage 1 May 1991. She specialized in Chunhyangga, which is the 5th Important Intangible Cultural Property of Korea.

Biography
Oh Jeong-suk was born in Wanju, Jeollabuk-do, Korea. She learned the basic pansori from her neighbors when she was young. One of her ancestors was master of pansori Oh Sam-ryong. She was a member of Wori Gugak Group from the age of 14 to 18. She concentrated on mastering pansori and performing at the age of 21, and then she moved to Seoul when she was 23 to learn special parts from Chunhyangga from Kim So-hee. In 1962, she apprenticed under the pansori master Kim Yeon-soo and started to learn Chunhyangga, Heungbuga, Sugungga, Jeokbyeokga, Simcheongga, which are all kinds of pansori. She died at the age of 73.

Career
 1950 - 1963 Mastering the 5 songs of pansori from master Kim yeon-soo: Chunhyangga, Heungboga, Sugungga, Jeokbyeokga, Simchungga              
 1967 The 5th Important Intangible Cultural Heritage, Dongchoje Chunhyangga vocational scholarship
 1972 Complete performance of Chunhyangga
 1973 Complete performance of Heungboga
 1974 Complete performance of Sugungga
 1975 Complete performance of Simchungga
 1976 Complete performance of Jeokbyeokga
 1977 Joined the National Changguk Company of Korea
 1980 Tour of North America
 1981 Participation in Hong Kong Folk Festival
 1984 Instructor of Gukak at Chung-Ang University College of Music
 1985 Instructor of Gukak at Chu-gye Art University; participated in Festival of World Cultures Horizonte in Berlin; instructor of Gukak at Hanyang University College of Music  
 1986 Instructor of Gukak at Ihwa women's University College of Music; participated in the 4th International Peace Music Festival with Chunhyangjeon
 1988 Instructor of Gukak at Seoul National University College of Music 
 1989 Joined the world tour at the European Folk Music Festival
 1990 Attended concerts, Pan-national Reunification held in Pyongyang 
 1991 Designated ingan munhwajae
 1999 Professor at Korea National University of Fine Arts 
 2002 Instructor of Ewha Womans University Graduate School

Awards
 1972 First prize in performing Important Intangible Cultural Heritage
 1975 First prize Jeonju Daesaseup for Pansori
 1983 President's prize in the 1st South Cultural Property for pansori
 1984 KBS Gukak Award
 2000 Presidential medal

References
website for oh jeong-suk 

Korean traditional musicians
Pansori